Hypocrita reedia is a moth of the family Erebidae. It was described by Schaus in 1910. It is found in Costa Rica.

References

Hypocrita
Moths described in 1910